Dalton Delan (born August 5, 1954) is an American writer, syndicated columnist, and television producer. He pens his syndicated  column, the Unspin Room, for the Pulitzer Prize winning newspaper The Berkshire Eagle. His work with  PBS and Sundance have won him numerous awards for documentaries and primetime shows. A number of his projects include working alongside notable figures like actor Robert Redford, Ken Burns and Henry Louis Gates Jr. Delan oversaw the production of sixteen In Performance at the White House programs in collaboration with the Obama administration, as well as several under the Bush and Clinton administrations years prior. As executive producer, Delan brought music giants like Bob Dylan,  Paul McCartney, Mick Jagger, Stevie Wonder, Paul McCartney, Burt Bacharach, and Carole King to the White House. The final program under the Obama administration,  The Smithsonian Salutes Ray Charles, is documented on Youtube as "WETA at the White House", features singers like Demi Lovato, Usher, and Anthony Hamilton.

Delan was an executive producer of the Mark Twain Prize for American Humor, presented by the Kennedy Center to notable names in humor and comedy. Delan was also co-creator and was an executive producer of the Library of Congress Gershwin Prize for Popular Music, whose first recipient, Paul Simon, was presented the award in a ceremony at the Warner Theater. Delan's most recent work has him as the managing director and chief content officer of One Mind All Media, the media division for the brain health non-profit One Mind.

Early life
Delan was born in Manhattan, New York, to attorney and stock broker Daniel Delan, and advertising executive and artist, Stephanie Lord Delan. He has one older brother, Douglas Scott Delan, who works in the educational field.

Delan attended Phillips Exeter Academy  alongside subsequent music, film, and television veterans Bobby Shriver, Miles Chapin and Benmont Tench (former keyboard player for the late Tom Petty). Upon early graduation from Exeter, Delan attended Columbia University in New York, making the Dean's List both semesters. As a sophomore, Delan was recruited to Princeton University  as part of an effort to strengthen the English Department's student body. During his academic career at Princeton University, Delan was a member of the Phi Beta Kappa society, and won the Junior English Prize, as well as the Senior Thesis Prize in English. He was an active journalist during this time, writing for the Henry David Thoreau Journal, as editor of The Nassau Lit, and as a writer and critic for The Daily Princetonian. Delan graduated from Princeton University Summa Cum Laude in 1976. Following college, Delan began his career as a staff writer and editor for Time-Life Books, first in Manhattan and then in Washington D.C.

Career in television

Awards

ABC News
Delan got his start in television in 1979, working for ABC News in the ABC News Closeup documentary unit  under Pamela Hill. There, he helped produce investigative reports with several big names in media, including a film featuring writer and historian William Manchester, and hosts Hugh Downs, Peter Jennings, and Barbara Walters. Titles that Delan worked on include "After the Sexual Revolution" and "Growing Old in America". "Rain of Terror", another of Delan's works, was deemed by a The Wall Street Journal editorial as "the single best piece of television journalism we've ever witnessed."

HBO and Lifetime Television
In 1986, Delan was hired at HBO  to help build and serve as an executive producer of the America Undercover documentary series, as well as informational family programming specials. During his time working at HBO, Delan was known for recruiting filmmakers such as Alan and Susan Raymond, Jon Alpert  and Albert Maysles, and working on programs featuring TV personalities like Walter Cronkite and Mary Tyler Moore. Delan was hired by  Lifetime Television in 1990  to develop a variety of series and specials ranging from game shows and documentaries, to live events and their first primetime nonfiction series, "Confessions of Crime", as well as working with acclaimed actors and actresses, such as Glenn Close on the documentary "Broken Hearts, Broken Homes".

The Travel Channel
When Landmark Communications in Norfolk, Virginia, purchased The Travel Channel, Delan was hired in 1992 to help restart and grow the network, based in Atlanta. In addition to bringing in personalities such as Charles Kuralt, he also premiered the long-running series Globe Trekker (originally titled Lonely Planet).

The Sundance Channel 
In 1996 the founder of the Sundance Film Festival, Robert Redford, approached Delan to be the Creative Director and Executive Vice President of the Sundance Channel —a venture between Redford, Showtime, and Polygram. Working directly with Redford and Festival director Geoffrey Gilmore, Delan produced live broadcasts from the Sundance Film Festival in Park City, Utah. Delan also worked with filmmakers to develop original films (Marina Zenovich on "Independent's Day" and Leslie McCleave on "Meeting Marty"), as well as with prominent actors like Jon Cryer, Susan Sarandon, and Meg Tilly.

Public Media
From late 1998 to late 2019, Delan was the Executive Vice President and Chief Programming Officer of WETA Washington D.C., which he took from third to second largest producing station for PBS (Public Broadcasting Service), and the flagship public television station in the nation's capital. At WETA, Delan worked with Sharon Percy Rockefeller, wife of John Davison "Jay" Rockefeller IV, retired senior Senator from West Virginia.  In 1999, Ken Bode's contract as moderator on the popular news discussion talk show, "Washington Week in Review" was not renewed. Despite criticism from Bode and his supporters, Delan held his ground in the ensuing media firestorm, and temporarily brought back long-time moderator Paul Duke before naming journalist Gwen Ifill as moderator. This move would help create a newly successful Washington Week with Gwen Ifill. Upon Ifill's death, Delan brought in Washington Post reporter Robert Costa as moderator. Delan collaborated with Kerry Kennedy, the daughter of Robert F. Kennedy, on an adaptation of her book Speak Truth to Power, which was filmed onstage at the Kennedy Center, with readings by Sigourney Weaver, John Malkovich and a number of other distinguished actors. Delan also served as Executive in Charge of Production for WETA on the films of Ken Burns. In 2003, Jerry Nachman, then-New York Post editor and editor-in-chief of MSNBC, called Delan "the so-called father of reality TV."

One Mind All Media 
After more than two decades in public television, in early 2020 Delan launched a media division, One Mind All Media, for One Mind (501(c)3), a leader in brain health research and workplace best mental health practices. As its first Managing Director and Chief Content Officer, Delan cited the goal of telling "the stories of the most pressing issue of our time, brain and mental health". President of One Mind, Brandon Staglin, stated "with Dalton's tremendous acumen and media experience, ONE MIND ALL MEDIA is primed to transform popular culture toward hope, compassion and action to help the sixty million Americans struggling with mental health challenges."

Syndicated Column 
Delan writes a biweekly syndicated column, The Unspin Room, for Pulitzer Prize-winning daily, The Berkshire Eagle, whose roots reach back to 1789. Delan's column explores the intersection of culture, media, current events, and institutional memory.

Books
In 2012, Delan wrote a children's book, Christmas Rose, illustrated by Yolanda Prinsloo, which is available as an audiobook on Youtube. Delan wrote the entry "Bob Dylan Cover Songs" in "The Enlightened Bracketologist: The Final Four of Everything," edited by Mark Reiter and Richard Sandomir. Delan was also Editor of "Positively Prince Street" in 1979.

Personal life
While working at ABC News in 1981, Delan met his future wife Stacey Lauren Delan (née Berson) (born 1958) of New York City. They married on August 11, 1982. Together, they have two children, Dashiell (born 1988) and Jesse (born 1991).

Selected filmography

References

1954 births
Living people
People from Manhattan
American television executives
News & Documentary Emmy Award winners
Peabody Award winners